The Tyrolean Hound is a breed of dog that originated in Tyrol also called the Tiroler Bracke or Tyroler Bracke. They are scent hounds that descended from the Celtic hounds in the late 1800s, mainly for their hunting skills. They are hardworking, passionate, and independent dogs not known for their size, but rather their intelligence. For that reason, hunters can regularly use these dogs to catch their prey, wounded or otherwise. Their ability to stretch over long distances, on rough hot or cold terrain for their prey is also another perk of keeping this dog by your side. Hunters do have to worry about injuries to their dog, however, along with the common injuries that these dogs obtain throughout their life, like hip dysplasia or ear infections. Barring any injuries, these dogs tend to live an energetic life for about 12-14 years, and tend to be an overall healthy and robust dog.

Description and history 
The Tyrolean Hound, also known as the Tyroler Bracke, is a breed of scent hound originally developed in the 1800s from the Bracke hounds and the Celtic hounds. It was first bred in Tyrol as a dog adapted to hunting in the snow. Emperor Maximilian I used this hound for hunting hare and fox and for tracking wounded game. Breeding began in 1860, and then in 1896 the first standard of breeding was published. Followed shortly thereafter, the Tyrolean Hound was recognized as their own breed in 1908. It was not until 2006, that the Tyrolean Hound was recognized by the United Kennel Club.

As with dogs that come from hardworking scent hound breeds, the Tyrolean hound was bred for their hunting ability. The breed is known for their excellent ability in being able to maneuver through mountainous or heavily wooded areas, and for their amazing scenting skills. This is all made possible with the size of the Tyrolean Hound. It tends to be a medium to large dog, measuring in at about 18.5 to 24 inches tall, and weighing about 35 to 60 pounds for males. Females tend to be smaller physically, only growing to be about 16.5 to 19 inches tall, however, both have a nice flowing outline and tend to be fairly muscular. The Tyrolean Hound, whether male or female, also has a thick double coat, with a coarse undercoat, as opposed to fine. They also tend to have the 3 main colors of red, black, and tan, with patches of white mixed in between.

Body breakdown

Head 
The head of the Tyrolean Hound is fairly broad with a slight arch going down the middle. This arch continues into the deep and straight muzzle of the dog, ending down at either a black or brown nose, with black is more desirable.

The teeth of the Tyrolean Hound should be spaced, and it would be normal to notice that the dog is missing one or two premolars. Above the snout, the eyes are not so deeply set, and tend to be dark brown, large, and round. Laying on top of the eye, the third eyelid should be pigmented and the eye rims should be close fitting. Above the eyes, this medium-sized hound has broad flat ears set high on the head with rounded ends. The ears can even reach up to the end of the nose when pulled forward.

Body 
The body is compact and rectangular in shape. They have a thick double coat including a coarse undercoat. There are two main colors, red and black with some tan, both of which may have white markings. It has a fast gait and can be used for either tracking or hunting. They have a deep chest that is moderately broad with a muscular fore-chest. The shoulder blades and upper arms are sloping and form a near right angle. The withers are pronounced and the croup slopes gently down the dog. The forelegs are straight with a medium bone, while the hind legs are well feathered, broad, and muscular. Lastly, the tail is set high on the back with a saber curve. The tail is carried high when the dog is excited, and preferably presents feathered with a thick brush of fur.

Temperament 
Like many working dogs, the Tyrolean hound is highly active, affectionate, and free-spirited. This is a highly intelligent dog and because of that, it tends to be very independent. While it can be stubborn from time to time, it can be easily trained. For this reason, the dog can make a good family pet, preferably with a big yard or constant access to an open field.

While the dog can have an independent streak and may lead to misbehavior, hunters often appreciate the fact that this dog can hunt alone, following wounded game for long distances. They are widely respected for the ability to hunt in hot and cold weather and in most any terrain. They have a quick, ground covering, and enduring gait, which makes for a passionate hunter who is fast and efficient. Alert and lively, though wary of strangers, this dog can be a tenacious hunter all the way down to a great stay at home pet, almost as if it has an ability to "switch off" and come home to rest. While their lack of aggression limits their ability to be a guard dog, they still have a loud bark to warn anyone that something is amiss, making them great watch dogs.

Health

Lifespan and lifestyle 
Tyrolean Hounds have an average life expectancy of about 12 to 14 years overall. These dogs are robust and generally healthy. They need to keep an active lifestyle and have high exercise requirements, though not hyperactive. As puppies, they should be given high-quality dry food until about 12 months when they can be transferred over to adult dry food. They can also take either active or working dog formulas, respectively with their lifestyle. When they are adults it can be necessary to keep them engaged with mental stimulation. Without such exercises or obedience training, they may lose passion in their work or other nuisance behaviors may appear. Also, with the harsh double coat that the Tyrolean Hound bares, they may need to be brushed once or two times a week along with other various health duties such as tooth brushing, coat grooming, and a weekly ear cleaning.

Common health problems

Hip dysplasia 
Hip dysplasia is often common in medium to larger sized dogs, especially when they are purebred. This is when the hip forms abnormally, leading to a chronic "wear and tear" leading to inflammation and osteoarthritis.

Hunting injuries 
Hunting has its obstacles and hardships for the Tyrolean Hound; the uneven ground and the excess vegetation that may grow. There is also the rotten branches and even the prey they are hunting themselves that can strike back.

Ear infections 
The large and droopy ears of the Tyrolean Hound make them very susceptible to infection, particularly when they go swimming. Any of the moisture or foreign debris that finds its way into the ear can cause bacteria and yeast build up, which leads to an ear infection. This can be maintained by cleaning out the ears whenever they come in from hunting, or by routinely cleaning them weekly.

See also
 Dogs portal
 List of dog breeds

References 

FCI breeds
Rare dog breeds
Scent hounds
Dog breeds originating in Austria